Noah Rubin won the title, beating Tommy Paul 3–6, 7–6(9–7), 6–3

Seeds

Draw

Finals

Top half

Bottom half

References
 Main Draw
 Qualifying Draw

Charlottesville Men's Pro Challenger - Singles
2015 Singles
Charlottesville